The weightlifting competitions at the 2009 Mediterranean Games in Pescara, Italy took place between 26 June and 30 June at the Pala Rigopiano.

Athletes competed in 22 events across 11 weight categories (7 for men and 4 for women). Three Women's (48 kg, 75 kg and +75 kg) and the Men's +105 kg category will not be held because too few nations applied.

Medal summary

Men's events

Women's events

Doping cases
Nikolaos Kourtidis who won 2 gold medal in the men's 94 kg, and Konstantina Lapou who took silver in the women's 58-kg, tested positive after the competition.

For Nurcan Taylan who won 2 gold medals in the women's 53 kg the IWF invalidated all results between middle of 2008 to 2016.

Medal table
Key:

References

External links
2009 Mediterranean Games report at the International Committee of Mediterranean Games (CIJM) website

2009
2009 in weightlifting